The Phantom Express is a 1932 American pre-Code mystery crime-drama directed by Emory Johnson and based on the Emory Johnson story.  The film stars William Collier, Jr. as Bruce Harrington, Sally Blane as Carolyn Nolan and Hobart Bosworth as Mr. Harrington. It was commercially released on August 15, 1932 by Majestic Pictures.



Plot
This story starts with engineer D.J. 'Smokey' Nolan, played by J. Farrell MacDonald speeding down the tracks at full throttle when he spies an oncoming train directly in his path. He quickly applies the emergency brakes, the train starts screeching to a halt but then derails. Several passengers are killed. An investigation cannot find any trace of the oncoming train that caused the derailment. Smoky is fired for negligence.

We come to find out Smoky has a beautiful daughter, Carolyn Nolan, played by Sally Blane.  We also learn the CEO of the Southwest Pacific Railroad, Mr. Harrington played by Hobart Bosworth, has a playboy son - Bruce Harrington played by William Collier, Jr.

Because of the derailment and other ill fortunes, Mr. Harrington has decided to sell the railroad for a fraction of its worth. He will sign the papers at midnight. In the meantime, Bruce meets Carolyn and finds out she is the daughter of the fired engineer. They instantly bond, then decide to set out together and solve the mystery of the phantom express.

During their investigation, they uncover a diabolical scheme concocted by a network of bad guys.   They find out the President of a rival railroad company played by Huntley Gordon has intentionally caused all of the accidents on the Southwest Pacific Railroad to drive the stock price down. After the stock plummets, the rival president figures he can buy all of the railroad's rolling stock at a reduced price.

Bruce discovers the plot just hours before his father, Mr. Harrington, will sign the railroad over to the bad guys. He tried to telegraph his father, but a storm has caused the telegraph to fail. In fact, the storm has knocked out all forms of communication.

In a twist of fate, the only way Bruce can advise his father not to sign the papers is to fire-up have train number 101, bring Smoky Nolan and his fireman out of retirement, and somehow try to highball back to the central office to prevent his father from signing. The train travels through the storm-savaged countryside encountering floods, landslides, and other hazards.  Bruce arrives just in the nick of time, advising his father to nix the deal.  He exposes the plot by the rival railroad, including how the bad guys constructed a piece of equipment and disguised it like an engine with headlights. They placed it on a nearby track causing Smoky to think he was heading towards a collision with an oncoming train.  Hence, the name - the phantom express.

During their investigation, Bruce and Carolyn fell in love.  They decide to get married. After they tie-the-knot, they honeymoon on the train.

Cast

Production
The main theme of the plot bears a close similarity to The Ghost Train (play), a movie version of which was produced in England the previous year, viz. The Ghost Train, but that source is not acknowledged in the credits. There was a prior silent American film also entitled The Phantom Express (1925), which may also have been influenced although uncredited by the original play. The film is sometimes confused with the earlier film with the same name. The earlier version, released in November 1925 starred Ethel Shannon and George Periolat.

The film is a talkie and was the last Hollywood film to be directed by Emory Johnson.

Preservation status
The Phantom Express was the first film in Emory Johnson's contract with Majestic Pictures. The film is also Emory Johnson's second talkie. The film's original length is listed at 6 reels. Emory Johnson directed 13 films, of which 11 were silent, and 2 were talkies.

This movie can be viewed on YouTube.

Gallery

Principal Players

References

External links 

1930s action films
1932 adventure films
1930s crime thriller films
1930s mystery thriller films
1930s romance films
1932 films
1932 drama films
American action adventure films
American adventure films
American black-and-white films
American crime thriller films
Remakes of American films
American mystery thriller films
American romance films
American romantic drama films
American silent feature films
Film Booking Offices of America films
Films set in San Francisco
Majestic Pictures films
Melodrama films
Sound film remakes of silent films
Films directed by Emory Johnson
1930s English-language films
1930s American films
Silent romantic drama films
Silent adventure films
Silent mystery films
Silent thriller films
Silent American drama films